Timothy Douglas Carter (5 October 1967 – 19 June 2008) was an English professional footballer who played as a goalkeeper. He was a goalkeeping coach at the time of his death.

During his career, Carter played for Bristol Rovers, Newport County, Sunderland, Carlisle United, Birmingham City, Hartlepool United, Millwall, Blackpool, Oxford United and Halifax Town. He also made three appearances for the England youth squad. As a goalkeeping coach he worked with the Sunderland first team and was also a part-time coach for the Estonia national team.

While he was at Sunderland, he was second choice goalkeeper behind Tony Norman from 1987 until 1993, during which time Sunderland won promotion to the First Division (now the Premier League) and also reached an FA Cup final.

Carter's body was found by a passerby in bushes in Stretford, Greater Manchester, in circumstances consistent with hanging. An inquest returned a verdict of suicide. It was reported that he had struggled to deal with his son's disabilities.

References 

1967 births
2008 deaths
English footballers
Association football goalkeepers
English Football League players
Bristol Rovers F.C. players
Newport County A.F.C. players
Sunderland A.F.C. players
Carlisle United F.C. players
Bristol City F.C. players
Birmingham City F.C. players
Hartlepool United F.C. players
Millwall F.C. players
Blackpool F.C. players
Oxford United F.C. players
Halifax Town A.F.C. players
Footballers from Bristol
Sunderland A.F.C. non-playing staff
England youth international footballers
Association football goalkeeping coaches
2008 suicides
Suicides by hanging in England